Sir James Penn Boucaut  (29 October 1831 – 1 February 1916) was a South Australian politician and Australian judge. He was a member of the South Australian House of Assembly on four occasions: from 1861 to 1862 for City of Adelaide, from 1865 to 1870 for West Adelaide (1865–1868) and The Burra (1868–1870), from 1871 to 1878 for West Torrens (1871–1875) and Encounter Bay (1875–1878), and a final stint in Encounter Bay in 1878.

At 34 years and 150 days of age, Boucaut was the youngest person to have been appointed Premier of South Australia. He was Premier three times: from 1866 to 1867, from 1875 to 1876, and from 1877 to 1878. He was Attorney-General of South Australia under Premiers John Hart and Henry Ayers, and served variously as Attorney-General, Treasurer, Commissioner of Public Works and Commissioner of Crown Lands and Immigration in his own ministries. He left politics in 1878 when he was appointed a judge of the Supreme Court of South Australia, serving until his retirement in 1905.

Early life
Boucaut was born in Mylor, Cornwall, the eldest son of a navy officer, Captain Ray Boucaut, and his wife, Winifred, daughter of James Penn, superintendent of the royal dockyard at Falmouth. He was educated at the Rev. Mr Hayley's school at Saltash.

Career in Australia
Boucaut left with his parents for South Australia in 1846, and after some work as a stockman in the interior, returned to Adelaide and entered the legal profession.  Boucaut was articled to Charles Fenn, and was admitted to the bar in November 1855, his career was a lawyer was successful. He first took over the practice of Josiah Partridge in partnership with one Herford, which dissolved around 1860. A partnership with William James Wren was cut short by the latter's death on 6 February 1864.
In December 1861 he was returned to the South Australian House of Assembly as a representative for the City of Adelaide district, but was defeated at the general election in 1862. In March 1865 he was elected for West Adelaide at the head of the poll. In October he became Attorney-General in the first Hart ministry, and when the premier retired to go to England in February 1866, Boucaut took his place in a reconstructed ministry which was in power until May 1867. Boucaut was narrowly defeated in the 1868 election for East Adelaide, but a few days later on 15 April he was returned unopposed for The Burra, where his father-in-law, Alexander McCulloch, stood down in his favour. He badly lost the 1869 election for The Burra but entered the house again as member for West Torrens in the by-election of 1871. In January 1872 he became Attorney-General in Ayers' sixth ministry, but retired when the cabinet was reconstructed early in March.

From 22 February 1875 to 25 September 1878 Boucaut represented Encounter Bay, and on 3 June 1875 Boucaut formed his second ministry, in which he was commissioner of crown lands and immigration. An education bill was successfully taken through the assembly, and in September Boucaut brought in a bill authorizing the raising of a loan of £3,000,000 for the construction or extension of 13 lines of railway and various other public works. But opposition in the council, and the fear of increased taxation, temporarily held up railway extensions. The cabinet was reconstructed in March 1876, but resigned early in the following June. The ministry of John Colton, which followed, adopted part of Boucaut's railway extension policy and succeeded in carrying it through. Boucaut formed his third ministry in October 1877 and became Treasurer of South Australia. During the following nine months some useful legislation was passed, including a crown lands consolidation bill, and provision for several railway lines and for the improvement of Victor Harbour. An income tax bill was defeated, but a property tax of threepence in the pound was agreed to. In September 1878, on the death of Justice Stow, Boucaut was appointed a judge of the Supreme Court of South Australia.

Boucaut was a judge for 27 years. It was at first thought that he could not be content to be out of politics, but he had a real interest in legal work and proved to be an excellent judge. He was acting chief justice during the absence of Justice Way in England in 1891–2, and several times acted as deputy governor between 1885 and 1897.

Boucaut remained very attached to his roots in Cornwall, being active in the Adelaide Cornish Association, and he considered Cornwall to be a nation.

His brother Bastin Boucaut (c. 1843 – 16 September 1864) was a member of B. T. Finniss's 1864 surveying party to the Northern Territory; he died of fever at Escape Cliffs, aged 21.

Late life and legacy
Boucaut resigned in February 1905 on a pension of £1,300 a year, on account of failing health. He had an estate at the foot of Mount Barker, where he bred purebred Arabian horses. His health improved with leisure and he lived until passing away at his home in Glenelg on 1 February 1916, aged 84.

Boucaut married Janet, daughter of Alexander McCulloch, in 1864 who predeceased him. He was survived by five sons and a daughter. He became a Q.C. in 1875 and was created K.C.M.G. in 1898. He published in London in 1905, his vigorously written The Arab, the Horse of the Future, and in the following year, Letters to My Boys, An Australian Judge and Ex-Premier on his Travels in Europe. Boucaut's Speeches on Railways and Public Works was published as a pamphlet in 1875.

References

Further reading

External links
 
 

1831 births
1916 deaths
Premiers of South Australia
Judges of the Supreme Court of South Australia
Australian pastoralists
Australian Knights Commander of the Order of St Michael and St George
Australian politicians awarded knighthoods
Australian federationists
People from Mylor, Cornwall
Australian people of Cornish descent
Treasurers of South Australia
Colony of South Australia judges
Attorneys-General of South Australia
English emigrants to colonial Australia
19th-century Australian businesspeople
Members of the South Australian House of Assembly